SNAFU Con is an annual three day anime convention held during October/November at the Grand Sierra Resort and Casino in Reno, Nevada. SNAFU is an abbreviation for Sierra Nevada Anime Fans Unite. The event was created by the Anime and Manga Society of UNR, under the name Shadows.

Programming
The convention typically offers an artist alley, contests, cosplay meetups, gaming (arcade, computer, console, tabletop), gaming tournaments, karaoke, masquerade, rave, swap meet, vendor's room, and workshops. SNAFU Con has 24 hour a day programming during the convention. They also hold a free "day zero" event. The Humane Society benefited from 2015's charity auction. 2017's charity auction benefited the Big Brothers Big Sisters of Northern Nevada.

History
In 2014, the Grand Sierra Resort's lower floor housed the convention. The convention in 2015 moved to the Nugget Casino Resort, due to space change issues at the Grand Sierra. Criticism about the 2015 masquerade was due to the long judging deliberations. The convention moved back to the Grand Sierra Resort in 2018. SNAFU Con 2020 was cancelled due to the COVID-19 pandemic.

Event history

References

External links
 SNAFU Con Website

Anime conventions in the United States
Recurring events established in 2010
2010 establishments in Nevada
Annual events in Nevada
Festivals in Nevada
Nevada culture
Conventions in Nevada